Henry Merritt Towne (born August 25, 1877) was an American college football player and coach. He served as the head football coach at Knox College from 1907 to 1909

References

1877 births
Year of death missing
Bates Bobcats football players
Knox Prairie Fire football coaches
People from Alfred, Maine